The 2022 Dr McKenna Cup, known for sponsorship reasons as the Bank of Ireland Dr McKenna Cup, was a Gaelic football competition in the province of Ulster for county teams. It took place in January 2022.

The McKenna Cup was cancelled in 2021 due to the impact of the COVID-19 pandemic on Gaelic games. The 2022 tournament was initially cancelled, but then restored. As in 2020, only county teams will compete, with no college teams. The group draw took place on 15 December 2021. Monaghan were the winners, defeating Donegal in the final.

Competition format
Group Stage

The nine teams are drawn into three sections of three teams. Each team plays the other teams in their section once, either home or away. Two points are awarded for a win and one for a draw. The points-ratio method (points for divided by points against) is used to determine the ranking of teams who are level on section points (as opposed to the more typical scoring differential).

Knock-out Stage

The winners of the three sections and the best of the runners-up in the three sections compete in the semi-finals with the two winners meeting in the final. Drawn games are decided by penalty shoot-out without any extra time being played.

Group stage

Section A

Section B

Section C

Ranking of section runners-up

Knock-out stage

Semi-finals

Final

References

 
Dr McKenna Cup seasons